Niels Edvard Sørensen (August 29, 1893 – May 15, 1954) was a  Danish politician representing the Liberal party, Venstre. He served briefly as party chairman 1949 – 1950.

Sørensen was born in Lindbjerg near Randers. He was a Member of Folketinget representing Aalborg County from April 24, 1929, standing in Bælum constituency.

References 
Gunnar Fog-Pedersen (1938), Vor Regering og Rigsdag, Nordisk Forlag, Copenhagen.

This article is a translation of the corresponding article on the Danish Wikipedia, accessed on January 12, 2007.

1893 births
1954 deaths
Members of the Folketing
Leaders of Venstre (Denmark)